The grey waxbill or black-tailed waxbill (Glaucestrilda perreini) is a common species of estrildid finch found in wetter land of Southern Africa. It has an estimated global extent of occurrence of 670,000 km2.

Habitat
It is found in subtropical/ tropical (lowland) moist shrubland habitats in Angola, the Republic of Congo, the Democratic Republic of the Congo, Eswatini, Gabon,  Malawi, Mozambique, South Africa, Tanzania, Zambia & Zimbabwe. The status of the species is evaluated as Least Concern.

References

External links
 Grey waxbill - Species text in The Atlas of Southern African Birds.
 BirdLife Species Factsheet

grey waxbill
Birds of Sub-Saharan Africa
grey waxbill
Taxa named by Louis Jean Pierre Vieillot
Taxobox binomials not recognized by IUCN